The 2022 Liga 1 U-18  (known as the Mola Elite Pro Academy Liga 1 U-18 2022 for sponsorship reasons) was the third season of the Liga 1 Elite Pro Academy U-18. The league is currently the youth level (U-18) football league in Indonesia. The season started on 15 August.

Bali United U18s were the defending champions.

18 teams divided into 3 groups.

Group A

Group B

Group C

Ranking of runner-up

Knockout stage 
Bracket

Semi-finals

Third place

Final

Awards 
 Top goalscorers: Muhammad Firman Januari (Persib U18s) (19 goals)
 Best player: Muhammad Ragil (Bhayangkara U18s) 
 Best referee: Dwi Aprialdi Prawira
 Best coach: Hartono (Bhayangkara U18s) 
 Best academy: Persib U18s
 Fair-play team: Persib U18s

See also 
  2022 Liga 1 U-14
  2022 Liga 1 U-16

References 

EPA U-18 2022
Sport in Indonesia